The molecular formula C16H21N3O2 may refer to:
 Zolmitriptan, a triptan used in the acute treatment of migraine attacks
 Cyanopindolol, a drug related to pindolol which acts as both a β1 adrenoceptor antagonist and a 5-HT1A receptor antagonist